"Beecher's Bibles" was the name given to the breech-loading Sharps rifle that were supplied to and used by the anti-slavery settlers and combatants in Kansas, during the Bleeding Kansas period (1854–1860). The breech loading model 1853 Sharps Carbines were shipped in crates marked "Books and Bibles". After an 1856 article in the New-York Tribune carried a quote by Henry Ward Beecher, the Sharps Carbines became known as Beecher's Bibles.

Background

For decades there had been a conflict between pro-slavery and anti-slavery activists in America. Before Missouri asked to be admitted to the United States there were 11 free and 11 slave states. Missouri was admitted as a slave state and Maine was admitted as a free state. The 1820 Missouri Compromise stated that all states south of Missouri could be admitted as slave states. In 1854 Congress initiated the Kansas–Nebraska Act which said voters could decide. Settlers from both sides came to Kansas. Violence was common between the two sides in Kansas. It was during this conflict that Minister Henry Ward Beecher raised funds to buy rifles for the free-staters: Beecher's Bibles were sent to the territory. Henry W. Beecher believed that such weapons were, "a greater moral urgency among border ruffians than the scriptures".

History

The name "Beecher's Bibles" in reference to Sharps rifles and carbines was inspired by the comments and activities of the abolitionist New England minister Henry Ward Beecher, of the New England Emigrant Aid Society, of whom it was written in a February 8, 1856, article in the New-York Tribune: Beecher was an outspoken abolitionist and he raised funds to buy weapons for Kansas free state settlers. Some newspapers began calling Beecher's church the "Bible and Rifle Company". From there the guns that were purchased and sent came to be known as Beecher’s Bibles. 

The term originated from the method of shipment: New England abolitionists sent Sharps Carbines to Kansas in an attempt to assist anti-slavery settlers there. The carbines were shipped in crates which were covered by bibles. The crates were marked with the words "Books and Bibles". The Sharps Carbines were hi-tech and they incorporated a breech loading design. The rifles were the Sharps Model 1853. The Federal and state authorities had forbidden sending arms to the territory but that did not stop abolitionists from donating funds for firearm purchases. Doctor Samuel Cabot donated $12,500 USD for the purchase of Sharps Carbines. Also according to Amos A. Lawrence, the treasure for the New England Emigrant Aid Society, the society purchased 100 rifles for the cause. There were approximately 900 Beecher's Bibles which were used in the Kansas conflict.

References

Bibliography
 

Rifles
Bleeding Kansas
Guns of the American West
Arms trafficking
Abolitionism in the United States